Gen. William C. Lee House is a historic home located at Dunn, Harnett County, North Carolina. It was built about 1915, and is a two-story, three bay, double pile, Classical Revival style brick veneer mansion with a hipped roof.  It has one-story rear wings and features a full facade porch with monumental Tuscan order columns. It was the home of World War II General William C. Lee, whose wife acquired it in 1935.  The house contains offices for the Dunn Area Chamber of Commerce and a museum memorial to the General.

It was listed on the National Register of Historic Places in 1983.

References

Houses on the National Register of Historic Places in North Carolina
Neoclassical architecture in North Carolina
Houses completed in 1915
Houses in Harnett County, North Carolina
National Register of Historic Places in Harnett County, North Carolina